Vilayattasseri Mullambalath Balachandran (25 November 1924 – 9 January 2010), known as Vimcy, was a sports writer from Kerala. He is considered to be the pioneer of sports journalism in Kerala.

Biography 
Balachandran was born on 25 November 1924 at Thamarassery in Kozhikode district to Dr. Narayanan Nair and Narayani. Unable to finish his intermediate education at Palakkad Victoria College due to ill health, he joined the Kozhikode newspaper Dinaprabha in 1949 as a journalist. He used to write articles in Sanjayan and Viswaroopam under the pen-name of Thampi. In 1950, he became the assistant editor at Mathrubhumi. After his retirement from Mathrubhumi in 1984, he became associate editor for Calicut Times. He continued to write sports columns for Mathrubhumi, Calicut Times and Madhyamam. His autobiography titled Valkkashnam was published in 2008. Vimcy died on 9 January 2010 at Bilathikulam in Kozhikode.

Sports journalism 
At a time when Malayalam newspapers dedicated little space to sports news, Vimcy started an entire sports page with Mathrubhumi. It was under him that sports writing became a separate branch of journalism in Kerala. Vimcy was also behind the weekly sports feature page Sports Special in Mathrubhumi. He used to write extensively about Football.

Vimcy won numerous awards including one from Kerala State Sports council for lifelong contributions to the field of sports journalism. Other awards included M.P. Paily award, Neelambaran Memorial award (from Kesari Memorial Committee), T. Aboobacker award and Press Academy Silver Jubilee award.

References 

1924 births
2010 deaths
Indian sports journalists
People from Kozhikode district
Malayalam-language journalists
Malayalam-language writers
Government Victoria College, Palakkad alumni
Journalists from Kerala
Indian male journalists